Jarmo Valtonen (born 29 November 1982 in Espoo) is a Finnish long track speed skater who participates in international competitions.

Personal records

Career highlights

European Allround Championships
2004 - Heerenveen, 27th
2005 - Heerenveen, 24th
2006 - Hamar, 23rd
2007 - Collalbo, 15th
2008 - Kolomna,  33rd
World Junior Allround Championships
1999 - Geithus, 29th
2000 - Seinäjoki, 22nd
2001 - Groningen, 19th
National Championships
2001 - Helsinki,  3rd at 10000 m
2001 - Helsinki,  3rd at allround
2001 - Harjavalta,  1st at 500 m
2001 - Harjavalta,  2nd at 1500 m
2001 - Harjavalta,  3rd at 5000 m
2002 - Seinäjoki,  2nd at 10000 m
2002 - Helsinki,  3rd at sprint
2003 - Seinäjoki,  2nd at 10000 m
2003 - Seinäjoki,  1st at allround
2004 - Helsinki,  1st at 5000 m
2004 - Seinäjoki,  2nd at 10000 m
2004 - Seinäjoki,  1st at allround
2004 - Helsinki,  2nd at 500 m
2005 - Helsinki,  3rd at 1000 m
2005 - Helsinki,  1st at 5000 m
2007 - Helsinki,  1st at allround
Nordic Junior Games
1999 - Helsinki,  3rd at 500 m
2000 - Chemnitz,  2nd at 500 m
2001 - Göteborg,  2nd at 1000 m

External links
 
 Valtonen at Jakub Majerski's Speedskating Database
 Valtonen at SkateResults.com

1982 births
Finnish male speed skaters
Living people
Sportspeople from Espoo